Ernst Mahle (born 3 January 1929) is a Brazilian composer and orchestra conductor of German birth.

Biography
Mahle was born in Stuttgart, Germany. He studied music with Johann Nepomuk David in Stuttgart before coming to Brazil in 1951, and then with Hans-Joachim Koellreutter in Piracicaba. He became a Brazilian citizen in 1962. In 1953 he was one of the founders of the Escola de Música de Piracicaba. After studying music there, he became artistic director and conductor of the orchestra and choir of the institute, holding these posts for more than fifty years.

In 2005, Mahle composed the opera O Garatuja, libretto by Eugênio Leandro. The opera was based on the homonymous novel by José de Alencar, which was premiered on 27 April 2006, at the Teatro Municipal de Piracicaba "Dr Losso Netto". He is a member of the Brazilian Academy of Music (chair no. 6).

Works
 Marroquinhas Fru-Fru (1974) opera, libretto by Maria Clara Machado
 A Moreninha (1979) opera, libretto by José Maria Ferreira
 O Garatuja (2006) opera, libretto by Eugênio Leandro
 Isaura (2023) opera <https://abmusica.org.br/noticias/ernst-mahle-compoe-a-opera-isaura-com-estreia-prevista-para-2023/>

References

Sources
 Paulo Affonso de Moura Ferreira: Ernst Mahle: Catálogo de obras (Brasília: Ministério das Relações Exteriores, 1976).
 Eliane Tokeshi: "As sonatas e sonatinas para violino e piano de Ernst Mahle: Uma abordagem dos aspectos estilísticos", in I Seminário Nacional de Pesquisa em Performance Musical. III: Belo Horizonte, 2000, edited by André Cavazotti, pp. 43–56 (Belo Horizonte: Universidade Federal de Minas Gerais, 2001); also constituting the journal Per musi: Revista de performance musical no. 3 (January–June 2001).

External links
Escola de Música de Piracicaba  (with short bio)
Compositores e obras do CD "Com licença!..."  (Short bio)
Classical Composers Database

1929 births
Living people
20th-century conductors (music)
20th-century Brazilian musicians
20th-century male musicians
21st-century male musicians
21st-century Brazilian musicians
21st-century conductors (music)
Brazilian classical composers
Brazilian opera composers
Brazilian male composers
Brazilian people of German descent
Male classical composers